Kandukur Assembly constituency is a constituency of the Andhra Pradesh Legislative Assembly, India. It is one of eight  constituencies in the Nellore district.

It is part of the Nellore Lok Sabha constituency along with another six Vidhan Sabha segments: Kavali, Atmakur, Kovuru, Nellore City, Nellore Rural and Udayagiri in the Nellore district.

The constituency covers 5 Mandals including Municipality(Town) Gudluru, Lingasamudram, Kandukur, Ulavapadu, Voletivaripalem and Kandukur Municipality.

Town

Kandukur Municipality
Kandukur Municipality. The Kandukur town  is divided into 22 wards, total administration over 13,934 houses for which elections are held every 5 years. The Kandukur Municipality has population of 57,246 of which 28,644 are males while 28,602 are females as per report released by Census India 2011.

Mandals 

The five mandals that form the assembly constituency are:

Members of Legislative Assembly

Election results

Assembly Elections 2019

Assembly elections 2014

Assembly Elections 2009

Assembly Elections 2004

Assembly Elections 1999

Assembly Elections 1994

Assembly Elections 1989

Assembly Elections 1985

Assembly Elections 1983

Assembly Elections 1978

Assembly Elections 1972

Assembly Elections 1967

Assembly Elections 1962

Assembly Elections 1955

Assembly elections 1952
				

					
		

			

 List of constituencies of Andhra Pradesh Legislative Assembly

References

Assembly constituencies of Andhra Pradesh